The presidency armies were the armies of the three presidencies of the East India Company's rule in India,  later the forces of the British Crown in India, composed primarily of Indian sepoys. The presidency armies were named after the presidencies: the Bengal Army, the Madras Army and the Bombay Army. Initially, only Europeans served as commissioned or non-commissioned officers. In time, Indian Army units were garrisoned from Peshawar in the north, to Sind in the west, and to Rangoon in the east. The army was engaged in the wars to extend British control in India (the Mysore, Maratha and Sikh wars) and beyond (the Burma, Afghan, First and Second Opium Wars, and the Expedition to Abyssinia).

The presidency armies, like the presidencies themselves, belonged to the Company until the Indian Rebellion of 1857, when the Crown took over the Company and its three armies. In 1895, the three presidency armies were merged into a united Indian Army.

Origin
The origin of the British Indian Army and subsequently the army of independent India lies in the origins of the Presidency Armies which preceded them. The first purely Indian troops employed by the British were watchmen employed in each of the Presidencies of the British East India Company to protect their trading stations. These were all placed in 1748 under one Commander-in-Chief, Major-General Stringer Lawrence who is regarded as the "Father of the Indian Army".

From the mid-eighteenth century, the East India Company began to maintain armies at each of its three main stations, or Presidencies of British India, at Calcutta (Bengal), Madras and Bombay. The Bengal Army, Madras Army, and Bombay Army were quite distinct, each with its own Regiments and cadre of European officers. All three armies contained European regiments in which both the officers and men were Europeans, as well as a larger number of 'Native' regiments, in which the officers were Europeans and the other ranks were Indians. They included Artillery, Cavalry and Infantry regiments, so historical sources refer to the Bengal/Madras/Bombay Artillery/Cavalry/Infantry (the latter often termed "Native Infantry" or "N.I."). From the mid-eighteenth century onwards, the Crown began to dispatch regiments of the regular British Army to India, to reinforce the Company's armies. These troops are often referred to as "H.M.'s Regiments" or "Royal regiments".

By 1824, the size of the combined armies of Bengal, Madras, and Bombay was about 200,000 and had at least 170 sepoy and 16 European regiments. In 1844 the combined average strength of the three armies was 235,446 native and 14,584 European.

Regimental organisation
In 1757, Robert Clive came up with the idea of sepoy battalions for the Bengal Presidency. These would be Indian soldiers, armed, dressed, and trained the same as the "red coats" (British soldiers), and commanded by a nucleus of British officers. The Madras Presidency followed suit with six battalions in 1759, followed by the Bombay Presidency in 1767. Recruitment in all cases was done locally, with battalions each drawn from single castes, and from specific communities, villages, and families. Regular cavalry regiments were raised in 1784, of which only three survived the Indian Rebellion of 1857. Irregular cavalry were raised by the "silladar system" employed by rulers of Indian states. Irregular cavalry regiments had very few British officers. In addition, native artillery and pioneers (referred to later as Sappers and Miners) were also raised.

Between 1796 and 1804, a regimental system on a two battalion basis was introduced. The battalions were only theoretically linked together and shared no esprit de corps. The number of British officers went up to 22 per battalion, which diminished the importance of native officers. Control by Regimental commanders was excessive and exasperating to the battalions, and the system was reverted in 1824. Thereafter, units were formed into single battalion regiments, which were numbered per their seniority of raising.

After 1857
Following the Indian Rebellion of 1857 and the consequent takeover of power by the British government from the East India Company, its European regiments were amalgamated in 1860 with the British Army, but its 'Native' regiments were not. The three separate Presidency Armies therefore continued to exist, and their European officers continued to be listed as members of the Bengal, Madras or Bombay Army rather than the British Army. However, the Presidency Armies began to be described collectively as the Indian Army. Following the Rebellion recruitment of 'Native' Regiments switched to the Martial Race system. Another change resulting from the Indian Rebellion of 1857 was that henceforward artillery was confined to the British Army.

In 1895, the separate Presidency Armies were at last abolished and a fully unified Indian Army came into being. As before, its British officers were not members of the British Army, though as young subalterns they did serve for a year with a British Army regiment as part of their training before taking up permanent commissions with their Indian Army regiment.

Operational history of the Presidency armies

Mysore wars
First Anglo-Mysore War (1766–69)
Second Anglo-Mysore War (1780–84)
Third Anglo-Mysore War (1789–92)
Fourth Anglo-Mysore War (1799)

Maratha wars
First Anglo-Maratha War (1775–82)
Second Anglo-Maratha War (1803–05) 
Third Anglo-Maratha War (1817–18)

Burmese wars
First Anglo-Burmese War (1823–26)
Second Anglo-Burmese War (1852–53)
Third Anglo-Burmese War (1885–86)

Afghan wars

First Anglo-Afghan War (1839–42)
Second Anglo-Afghan War (1878–81)

Opium wars
First Opium War (1839–43)
Second Opium War (1856–60)

Sikh wars
First Anglo-Sikh War (1845–46)
Second Anglo-Sikh War (1848–49)

Abyssinia
Expedition to Abyssinia (1867–68)

List of presidencies and armies

Bengal Presidency, the Bengal Army
Bombay Presidency, the Bombay Army
Madras Presidency, the Madras Army

See also
Company rule in India

References

Further reading
 Barua, Pradeep. "Military developments in India, 1750-1850," Journal of Military History, (Oct 1994) 58#4 pp 599–616 in JSTOR
 Bryant, G. J. "Asymmetric Warfare: The British Experience in Eighteenth-Century India," Journal of Military History (2004) 68#2 pp. 431–469 in JSTOR
 Gilbert, Arthur N. "Recruitment and Reform in the East India Company Army, 1760-1800," Journal of British Studies (1975) 15#1  pp. 89-111 in JSTOR
 Heathcote, T. A. The Military in British India: The Development of British Land Forces in South Asia, 1600–1947 (Manchester University Press, 1995)
 Lawford, James P. Britain's Army in India: From its Origins to the Conquest of Bengal (London: George Allen & Unwin, 1978)
 Menezes, S. L. Fidelity & Honour: The Indian Army from the Seventeenth to the Twenty-First Century (New Delhi: Viking, 1993)
 Longer,  V. Red Coats to Olive Green: A History of the Indian Army, 1600–1947 (Bombay: Allied, 1974)
 Roy, Kaushik. "The hybrid military establishment of the East India Company in South Asia: 1750–1849," Journal of Global History, (July 2011) 6#2 00 195-218
 Roy, Kaushik. "Military Synthesis in South Asia: Armies, Warfare, and Indian Society, c. 1740--1849," Journal of Military History, (2005) 69#3 pp 651-690, online
 Roy, Kaushik. From Hydaspes to Kargil: A History of Warfare in India from 326 BC to AD 1999'' (2004)

Military history of the British East India Company
British East India Company
Military of British India
History of the Indian Army
Military units and formations of British India
Private armies